Carter–Worth House and Farm, also known as Armstrong Farm, Upper Plantation, Francis Worth Farm, and Tall Pine Farm, is a historic home and farm located in East Bradford Township, Chester County, Pennsylvania. The original section of the house was built about 1815.  It was a two-story, three bay, serpentine structure with a gable roof.  It was later expanded to three stories and doubled in size sometime before the Civil War.

It was added to the National Register of Historic Places in 1977.  It is located in the Worth-Jefferis Rural Historic District.

References

Houses on the National Register of Historic Places in Pennsylvania
Houses completed in 1815
Houses in Chester County, Pennsylvania
Historic district contributing properties in Pennsylvania
National Register of Historic Places in Chester County, Pennsylvania